Samuel Rufus McDaniel (January 28, 1886September 24, 1962) was an American actor who appeared in over 210 television shows and films between 1929 and 1950. He was the older brother of actresses Etta McDaniel and Hattie McDaniel.

Early life
Born in Wichita, Kansas, to former slaves, McDaniel was one of 13 children. His father Henry McDaniel fought in the Civil War with the 122nd USCT and his mother, Susan Holbert, was a singer of gospel music. In 1900, the family moved to Colorado, living first in Fort Collins and then in Denver where he grew up and graduated from Denver East High School. The children of the McDaniel family had a traveling minstrel show. After the death of brother Otis in 1916, the troupe began to lose money. In 1931, McDaniel found work in Los Angeles with sisters Hattie, Etta and Orlena. Sam was working on KNX radio program called The Optimistic Doughnut Hour, and he was able to get his sister a spot.

Career
McDaniel almost exclusively played butler, doormen, valet, porter and servant roles in films.

He played Doc, the competent ship's cook, in the Oscar-winning 1937 film Captains Courageous.  He also played Spiffingham the Butler in the Three Stooges film Heavenly Daze (1948). He is the only African-American to ever appear on I Love Lucy, playing "Sam the Porter" in the 1955 episode "The Great Train Robbery". He appeared uncredited as a waiter on a train in both the 1947 film The Egg and I (with Fred MacMurray and Claudette Colbert) and its first followup Ma and Pa Kettle (1949). He also played various supporting roles on TV's The Amos 'n' Andy Show (1951–53).

Death
McDaniel died of throat cancer on September 24, 1962 in Woodland Hills, Los Angeles, California.

Filmography

 Hallelujah (1929) as Adam (film debut) 
Brown Gravy (1929)
 Dance, Fools, Dance (1931) as Luva's butler (uncredited)
 The Public Enemy (1931) as Head waiter
 A Free Soul (1931) as Casino valet (uncredited)
 Guilty Hands (1931) as Jimmy (uncredited)
 Are You Listening? (1932)
 Grand Hotel (1932)
 The Rich Are Always with Us (1932) as Max, Julian's butler
 Movie Crazy (1932) as Men's room attendant (uncredited)
 Once in a Lifetime (1932) 
 Whistling in the Dark (1933)
 Employees' Entrance (1933) as Building janitor (uncredited)
 Blondie Johnson (1933)
 Footlight Parade (1933)
 The Late Christopher Bean (1933)
 Lady Killer (1933)
 Going Hollywood (1933) as Rasputin, the train Porter 
 Broadway Thru a Keyhole (1933) 
 Fugitive Lovers (1934) as Janitor (uncredited)
 Manhattan Melodrama (1934) as Black Boy (uncredited)
 Operator 13 (1934) 
 The Old Fashioned Way (1934) as Train porter
 The Dragon Murder Case (1934)  
 Belle of the Nineties (1934) as Jasmine's admirer (uncredited)  
 Evelyn Prentice (1934) 
 Kid Millions (1934) as Ship's steward (uncredited)
 One Hour Late (1934) as Waiter
 Gold Diggers of 1935 (1935)
 Rendezvous (1935)
 Hearts Divided (1936)
 Poor Little Rich Girl (1936)
 The Gorgeous Hussy (1936)
 Polo Joe (1936) as Harvey (uncredited) 
 A Family Affair (1937) 
Dark Manhattan (1937) as Jack Johnson
 Captains Courageous (1937) as Doc
 It Happened in Hollywood (1937)
 Jezebel (1938)
 Four's a Crowd (1938) 
 They Made Me a Criminal (1939) 
 Union Pacific (1939) 
 Days of Jesse James (1939) 
 Virginia City (1940)
 Brother Orchid (1940)
 Too Many Husbands (1940) as Porter  
 Virginia (1941)
 The Great Lie (1941)
 Bad Men of Missouri (1941)
 You Belong to Me (1941)
 All Through the Night (1942) 
 In This Our Life (1942)
 Silver Queen (1942)
 I Was Framed (1942) as Kit Carson, cook and servant
 After Midnight with Boston Blackie as Train porter (uncredited)
 Son of Dracula (1943) as Andy (uncredited)
 The Iron Major (1943)
 The Adventures of Mark Twain (1944)
 Andy Hardy's Blonde Trouble (1944)
 3 Men in White (1944)
 Double Indemnity (1944) as Charlie, garage attendant
 Three Little Sisters (1944) as Benjy
 Home in Indiana (1944)
 Tall in the Saddle (1944)
 Music for Millions (1944)
 Experiment Perilous (1944) as Train porter (uncredited)
 Dillinger (1945)
 The Naughty Nineties (1945)
 Lady on a Train (1945)
 My Reputation (1946) 
 Without Reservations (1946) as Freddy
 Centennial Summer (1946)  
 Never Say Goodbye (1946)
 The Egg and I (1947)
 The Secret Life of Walter Mitty (1947) 
 The Foxes of Harrow (1947) 
 Race Street (1948)
 The Babe Ruth Story (1948)
 Heavenly Daze (1948, Short)
 Ma and Pa Kettle (1949)
 Flamingo Road (1949)
 The File on Thelma Jordon (1950)
 The President's Lady (1953)
 Sangaree (1953)
 A Lion Is in the Streets (1953)
 Affair with a Stranger (1953)
 Carmen Jones (1954)
 A Man Called Peter (1955)
 Good Morning, Miss Dove (1956)
 Johnny Trouble (1957)
 A Hole in the Head (1959)
 Ice Palace (1960) 
 The Adventures of Huckleberry Finn (1960) (final film)

References

External links

 
 

1886 births
1962 deaths
American male film actors
American male television actors
African-American male actors
Deaths from cancer in California
Burials at Valhalla Memorial Park Cemetery
Male actors from Kansas
Actors from Wichita, Kansas
20th-century American male actors
20th-century African-American people